8Q or 8-Q may refer to:

8Q, IATA code for Onur Air
8Q, Aircraft registration for the Maldives
8Q SAM, a museum for contemporary art in Singapore
8q, an arm of Chromosome 8 (human)
8Q, designation for one of the Qumran Caves
8Q, a model of De Havilland Canada DHC-8

See also
Q8 (disambiguation)